The Jökulfirðir ("glacier fjords") form a system of five fjords in Westfjords, Iceland, situated north of Ísafjarðardjúp and south of the Hornstrandir peninsula. They are named for Drangajökull, a glacier situated to the southeast of the fjords.

The area surrounding the fjords used to be permanently inhabited until the 1960s, but is now occupied only seasonally, as a summer resort. The fjords cannot be reached by road, but are accessible by boat from Ísafjörður, Bolungarvík and Súðavík.

The individual five fjords are:
 Hesteyrarfjörður 
 Veiðileysufjörður 
 Lónafjörður 
 Hrafnsfjörður 
 Leirufjörður

References

Fjords of Iceland
Westfjords